Chandan Rawat (born 18  December 1986) is an Indian cricketer who plays for Assam cricket team. He is a right-handed batsman who bowled right-arm offbreak.

Rawat made his first-class debut in the 2004/05 Ranji Trophy against Baroda.

References

External links
 

Living people
Indian cricketers
Assam cricketers
Cricketers from Guwahati
1986 births